Wallen Ridge (also called Wallens Ridge) is a ridge in the U.S. states of Tennessee and Virginia.

Wallen Ridge was named after a pioneer who explored the area in the 1760s.

References

Landforms of Claiborne County, Tennessee
Landforms of Hancock County, Tennessee
Landforms of Union County, Tennessee
Ridges of Tennessee
Landforms of Lee County, Virginia
Ridges of Virginia